Ekenäs Idrottsförening (abbreviated EIF or Ekenäs IF) is a sports club from Ekenäs, Raseborg in Finland.  EIF was formed in 1905 and they are one of the oldest clubs in the south-west of Finland. The men's football first team currently plays in the Ykkönen (First Division).  Their home ground is at the Ekenäs Centrumplan in Ekenäs.  The Chairman of EIF is Peter Haglund.

The club currently has sections covering football, handball, floorball and disc golf.  EIF's athletics section set up Karis IK and from 1 January 2009, simultaneously with a municipal merger, transferred its activities to the new IF Raseborg club.

History 
Ekenäs Idrottsförening has a long football history which reached its pinnacle with one season in the highest division, the Mestaruussarja (Championship), back in 1933.  They have also had 8 seasons in the Suomisarjaa (Finland League) which at that time was the second tier of Finnish football in 1938–39 and 1946/47–51.

EIF have had five periods covering 26 seasons in the Kakkonen (Second Division), the third tier of Finnish football from 1975 to 1976, 1981–88, 1991–92, 1994–98 and 2002 to the current day.

EIF has a thriving junior section with a large number of teams.

A new highest ever attendance for an EIF match was made in 2013 when 2,014 people attended the home game with FC Jazz. The old record was from 1975 when 1,625 people attended the home game with HAIK.

EIF made history in March 2018 by qualifying for the Semi-final of the Finnish Cup for the first time, beating FC Haka 2-1 at home.

Season to season

Club structure
EIF currently has 2 men's team, 1 ladies teams, 12 boys teams and 4 girls team.

Other facts
EIF Akademi are participating in Section 1 (Lohko 1) of the Kolmonen (Third Division) administered by the Uusimaa SPL.  In 2009 the team finished in top position in their Nelonen (Fourth Division) section and were promoted to the Kolmonen.

EIF Ladies Team are competing in the Kolmonen (Third Division) administered by the Football Association of Finland  (Suomen Palloliitto) . In 2017 the team finished in top position in their Nelonen (Fourth Division) section and were promoted to the Kolmonen.

First team
As of 2 July 2021.

References

External links
 Official Website
 EIF Football Website

Football clubs in Finland
1905 establishments in Finland
Organisations based in Raseborg
Swedish-speaking population of Finland